This is a comprehensive list of lists related to San Francisco. San Francisco is a city in California, within the San Francisco Bay Area.

Natural features
 List of hills in San Francisco, California
 List of parks in San Francisco

Buildings and man-made features
 List of streets and alleys in Chinatown, San Francisco
 List of streets in San Francisco
 List of tallest buildings in San Francisco
 List of San Francisco Designated Landmarks
 National Register of Historic Places listings in San Francisco, California

Government
 List of mayors of San Francisco, California
 List of pre-statehood mayors of San Francisco

Colleges and universities
 List of colleges and universities in San Francisco
 List of San Francisco State University people
 List of University of San Francisco people

Sports
 List of baseball parks in San Francisco, California
 List of San Francisco 49ers broadcasters
 List of San Francisco 49ers first-round draft picks
 List of San Francisco 49ers head coaches
 List of San Francisco 49ers seasons
 List of San Francisco 49ers starting quarterbacks
 List of San Francisco Giants broadcasters
 List of San Francisco Giants managers
 List of San Francisco Giants Opening Day starting pitchers
 List of San Francisco Giants seasons

Other
 List of companies headquartered in San Francisco
 List of defunct San Francisco Municipal Railway lines
 List of events in the history of the San Francisco Police Department
 List of people associated with San Francisco
 List of San Francisco Ballet at 75 productions
 List of San Francisco Municipal Railway lines
 List of theatres in San Francisco
List of diplomatic missions in San Francisco
List of San Francisco Giants first-round draft picks
List of Golden Gate University people
Neighborhoods in San Francisco
Etymologies of place names in San Francisco
San Francisco Board of Supervisors elections, 2006
San Francisco Board of Supervisors elections, 2008
San Francisco Board of Supervisors elections, 2010
San Francisco County Jails
San Francisco County Parishes

See also 
Lists of San Francisco Bay Area topics